The Furstenberg's rosette is located in the internal streak canal of the teat. It radiates upward into the teat cistern. It often is considered a barrier for pathogens, yet it offers little resistance to milk leaving the teat.

Furstenberg's Rosette : Is situated at the internal end of the streak canal. It has a protective leukocyte population which are thought to leave the teat wall and enter the cistern via Furstenberg's Rosette. It contains bactericidal cationic proteins (e.g. ubiquitin).

References

Mammal anatomy